A list of mainland Chinese films released in 1990. There were 134 Chinese films produced in China in 1990.

References

External links
IMDb list of Chinese films

Chinese
Films
1990